Memorial is the fifth studio album by the American rock band Russian Circles. The album was released on October 29, 2013 through Sargent House. Memorial was produced by Brandon Curtis (Secret Machines, Interpol), who also produced the band's two previous albums, Empros (2011) and Geneva (2009).

Prior to the release of Memorial, Russian Circles released online streams of "Deficit" in August 2013, "Memorial" in September 2013 and "1777" in October 2013 to promote the album. Russian Circles' first tour in support of Memorial was a late-2013 European tour with Chelsea Wolfe.

Background and composition

Bassist Brian Cook said that Memorial is more "polarizing" between heavy and soft parts than previous efforts, and that the "heavy parts are much more blown out and exaggerated while the pretty moments are far more restrained, delicate, and atmospheric." Cook also described the album as being darker and more somber than previous efforts. Inspired by Pink Floyd's 1977 album Animals, Memorials album structure features the similarly composed intro/outro songs "Memoriam" and "Memorial" to make the album start and end in the same place.

Critical reception

Memorial received critical acclaim upon its release. At Metacritic, which assigns a normalized rating out of 100 to reviews from mainstream critics, the album has received an average score of 88, based on 8 reviews, indicating "universal acclaim". Writing for AllMusic, Gregory Heaney praised the album, stating that Memorial was "one of the band's strongest works to date", giving it four-and-half-stars out of five. Brice Ezell of PopMatters rated the album ten out of ten and called it "one of 2013’s true artistic masterpieces". Dom Lawson from The Guardian was also positive, writing that "Right now, few bands conjure such vital and nourishing food for the imagination." Exclaim!'s Farah Barakat wrote, "There's no questioning, however, the intricate craftsmanship that makes Memorial a memorable release in Russian Circles' ever-expanding discography." Brandon Stosuy of Pitchfork praised the band's ability to create interesting music with such a sparse, largely vocal-devoid lineup.

Memorial appeared on several publications' year-end lists.

Accolades

Track listing
All music written by Russian Circles.

Personnel
Memorial personnel adapted from CD liner notes.Russian Circles Brian Cook
 Mike Sullivan
 Dave TurncrantzAdditional musicians Jill Kaeding – cello
 Greg Norman – trombone
 Susan Voelz – violin
 Chelsea Wolfe – vocals on "Memorial"Recording and production Brandon Curtis – production
 Joe Lambert – mastering
 Greg Norman – engineering
 Russian Circles – productionArtwork and design'
 David Knudson – design
 Ryan Russell – photographs

Chart positions

References

2013 albums
Russian Circles albums
Sargent House albums